Linksfield is a suburb of Johannesburg, South Africa. It is a suburb lying north-east of the Johannesburg CBD and is surrounded southerly by Linksfield Ridge, easterly by Linksfield North and Bedford, St Andrews and Senderwood. Linksfield itself is located in Region E of the City of Johannesburg Metropolitan Municipality. On the southerly side and over the ridge are the areas of Cyrildene, Observatory and Morninghill, but these suburbs are not visible to Linksfield as they are hidden behind the Linksfield Ridge.

History
The suburb is located on part of an old Witwatersrand farm called Doornfontein. In 1910, the area was known as Muller's Plantation and it was many years later and after several attempts, before the land was successfully surveyed. It would be proclaimed as suburb on 8 March 1922 and its name is derived from the word Links and its closeness to the nearby Royal Johannesburg & Kensington Golf Club. The suburb was developed by A.M. Kennedy and Hermann Kallenbach. Kallenbach would build a house on Linksfield Ridge in 1929. The Huddlepark Golf Course and Driving Range borders with Linksfield and Linksfield North.

Parks and greenspace
The Harvey Nature Reserve lies on the western part of Linksfield Ridge. The land was donated to the people of Johannesburg in 1959 by Sydney Harvey and consisted of 7 acres for a nature and bird sanctuary. It is maintained by the Johannesburg City Parks.
The area borders with the controversial Rietfontein farm that was donated by President Paul Kruger to the people of Johannesburg as a tropical disease Hospital in approximately 1895. It is now known as Sizwe Hospital. The farm has the only pristine natural grasslands left in Johannesburg and is still the home for the Vervet monkeys and much natural fauna and flora. Unfortunately the farm is under threat for development.

Education
The suburb has two schools within it. Linksfield Primary School which has been open since 31 July 1950. The second is a Jewish school called King David Schools, Linksfield and was founded in 1948 and the high school in 1955. In close proximity is the Greek School, Saheti School, and the English Girls' School, St Andrews.

Notable residents past and present
Jani Allan, columnist lived in Linksfield Ridge with her husband, Gordon Schachat

References

Johannesburg Region E
Jews and Judaism in Johannesburg